('Freedom or Death') is the motto of Greece. It originated in the Greek songs of resistance that were powerful motivating factors for independence.

Overview
The motto arose during the Greek War of Independence in the 1820s, where it was a war cry for the Greeks who rebelled against Ottoman rule. It was adopted after the Greek War of Independence and is still in use today. The motto symbolized and still symbolizes the resolve of the people of Greece against tyranny and oppression.

This is also the motto of the 4th Infantry Division of the Greek Army.

Cultural references  
Nikos Kazantzakis' novel Captain Michalis was subtitled Freedom or Death, which became its title in the United States, Germany, France, and other countries.

See also
Give me liberty, or give me death!
God Save the South, whose lyrics contain the battle cry "Freedom or death!"
Greek War of Independence
Hymn to Liberty
Liberté, égalité, fraternité
Live free or die
Thanatos

References

1810s neologisms
National mottos
Political catchphrases
Liberty symbols
National symbols of Greece